Tulipa albanica is a flowering plant in the tulip genus, family Liliaceae that is native to Albania. It was discovered near the village of Surroj in Albania in 2010. The plant is a critically endangered (CR) as it grows in an area smaller than 100 ha, surrounded by mining activities. 

Related species include Tulipa scardica and Tulipa schrenkii. T. albanica bears morphological similarities to both species, as well as growing in a similar environment, but can be distinguished genetically as well as by T. albanica's undulating leaf shape.

Description
Tulipa albanica is a bulbous perennial reaching  in height. They grow alternately along the stem and the lowermost ones have strongly undulated edges.

The stem bears a solitary large, erect, campanulate flower. It can be found in two colour: yellow to golden-yellow or carmine-scarlet to deep reddish-brown. The chromosome number is 2n = 2x = 24.

Conservation
The Institute for Environmental Policy, a local NGO is carrying out monitoring and conservation actions, with the aim to propagate the plant to other locations in the region of Kukës, and secure its survival.

References

Bibliography
 
 
 

albanica
Endemic flora of Albania
Ephemeral plants
Plants described in 2010

Flora of Albania